Erigeron sumatrensis (syn. Conyza sumatrensis) is an annual herb probably native to South America, but widely naturalised in tropical and subtropical regions, and regarded as an invasive weed in many places. In the British Isles it is known as Guernsey fleabane. Other common names include fleabane, tall fleabane, broad-leaved fleabane, white horseweed, and Sumatran fleabane.

Description
When fully grown (in summer or autumn), Erigeron sumatrensis reaches one to two metres in height. Flowers are white rather than purple-pink. Its leaves are like dandelion leaves, but longer, thinner and more like primrose leaves in colour and texture. Its seeding heads are like dandelions, but straw coloured and smaller. In certain countries the plant has started to exhibit resistance to herbicides.

Distribution
It probably originates from South America, but is now naturalised in North America, Europe, Africa, Asia, and Australasia. It poses a significant threat to wildlife conservation areas and other reserves. In Britain, of the non-native former Conyza species, it is the second most abundant (after Erigeron canadensis) and is typically found in London and the South East of England. It was first recorded in London by Brian Wurzell in 1984,
and noted in France at Saint-Sozy (Dordogne) in 2006.

Gallery

References

External links

Erigeron sumatrensis occurrence data from GBIF

sumatrensis
Flora of South America
Ruderal species